Derry Township may be any of these places in the U.S. state of Pennsylvania:
Derry Township, Dauphin County, Pennsylvania, contains the community of Hershey, which is home to The Hershey Company
Derry Township, Mifflin County, Pennsylvania
Derry Township, Montour County, Pennsylvania
Derry Township, Westmoreland County, Pennsylvania

Pennsylvania township disambiguation pages